Scott Hanford Stossel (born August 7, 1969) is an American journalist and editor.

He is the national editor of The Atlantic magazine, and previously served as executive editor of The American Prospect magazine.

Life
He is a graduate of Harvard University. 
He is the son of Anne Hanford and Thomas P. Stossel, the brother of cartoonist Sage Stossel, and the nephew of TV journalist John Stossel. In 2014, Stossel was awarded the Erikson Institute Prize for Excellence in Mental Health Media.

Stossel has advocated for approaches to help anxiety.

Bibliography
 Stossel wrote and published an article My Anxious, Twitchy, Phobic (Somehow Successful) Life in the Atlantic magazine (January/February 2014) which describes his lifelong struggles with debilitating anxiety.  This article was adapted from his new book,
 Sarge: The Life and Times of Sargent Shriver, 
My Age of Anxiety: Fear, Hope, Dread, and the Search for Peace of Mind  January, 2014, Knopf.

References

External links

1969 births
Living people
American biographers
American magazine editors
American male biographers
American male journalists
American people of German-Jewish descent
Jewish American journalists
Harvard University alumni
The Atlantic (magazine) people
21st-century American Jews